Call of Duty: World at War is a video game on several platforms: 

Call of Duty: World at War for the PC, PlayStation 3, Wii and Xbox 360
Call of Duty: World at War – Zombies for the iPhone
Call of Duty: World at War – Final Fronts for the PlayStation 2
Call of Duty: World at War (Nintendo DS) for the Nintendo DS